Brian Robert Maunsell (16 October 1935 – 12 February 1987) was a New Zealand field hockey player. He competed in the men's tournament at the 1964 Summer Olympics.

Maunsell died on 12 February 1987. The Brian Maunsell Memorial Service to Sport Award, presented annually by Sport Northland, is named in his honour.

References

External links
 

1935 births
1987 deaths
New Zealand male field hockey players
Olympic field hockey players of New Zealand
Field hockey players at the 1964 Summer Olympics
Field hockey players from Whangārei
20th-century New Zealand people